David Bory (born 8 March 1976 in Vichy) is a retired French international rugby union player.

He spent most of his career playing for the Clermont and moved to the Castres Olympique in the French Top 14 club competition in 2004.
The next year he left France for Bath.
Bory played on the wing for France.
He was named to replace Xavier Garbajosa after Garbajosa blew out a knee during the 2003 Rugby World Cup.

References

External links
 David Bory on sporting-heroes.net
 RBS 6 Nations profile

French rugby union players
Rugby union wings
ASM Clermont Auvergne players
Bath Rugby players
France international rugby union players
People from Vichy
1976 births
Living people
Sportspeople from Allier